Jonathon Cooper (born January 8, 1998) is an American football outside linebacker for the Denver Broncos of the National Football League (NFL). He played college football at Ohio State.

Professional career

Cooper was drafted by the Denver Broncos in the seventh round, 239th overall, of the 2021 NFL Draft. On June 15, 2021, Cooper signed his four-year rookie contract with Denver.

Two days before the NFL draft, Cooper received bad news from doctors that there was an irregularity in his electrocardiogram test. Cooper had to have three separate heart procedures on the offseason to correct the irregular heartbeat.

References

External links
Denver Broncos bio
Ohio State Buckeyes bio

Living people
Denver Broncos players
American football defensive ends
American football outside linebackers
Ohio State Buckeyes football players
People from Franklin County, Ohio
Players of American football from Ohio
1998 births